The National Union for Democratic Progress is a political party in Liberia. It was founded by Prince Yormie Johnson, Senator for Nimba County and former head of the rebel Independent National Patriotic Front of Liberia, to contest the 2011 presidential and legislative elections.

References

External links
Official campaign website

Political parties in Liberia